Ahmadabad-e Mashir (also Romanized as Aḩmadābād-e Mashīr and Aḩmadābād-e Moshīr; also known as Mollā Bāshī) is a village in Fahraj Rural District, in the Central District of Yazd County, Yazd Province, Iran. At the 2006 census, its population was 2,664, in 630 families.

References 

Populated places in Yazd County